General Roberto Leal Monteiro, nicknamed Ngongo, is Home Affairs Minister of Angola, a top governmental position in that country.  He is — along with fellow "top generals" Higino Carneiro, João Maria de Sousa, Hélder Vieira Dias, and Kundi Paihama — one of the military leaders holding top ministerial posts for the Popular Movement for the Liberation of Angola, the political party that has ruled Angola since it gained its independence from Portugal in 1975.

References

Year of birth missing (living people)
Living people
Angolan military personnel
MPLA politicians
Interior ministers of Angola
Ambassadors of Angola to Russia